In The Army  ( Banakum) is an Armenian comedy drama television series. The series premiered on Shant TV on September 1, 2009. It has more than 300 episodes.
The series takes place in Yerevan, Armenia.

Series overview
The young boys join the army and find themselves in another world, where there are other rules of living. The boys from Yerevan, Gyumri, Lori, Martuni, and boys from other regions gather under one roof, to defend their homeland.

Each of the boys has his fears and shortcomings, which are presented with humor.

The course of the service of the soldiers is full of humorous stories and adventures.

Cast and characters
Artyom Karapetyan portrays Karlen Minasyan
Emil Galstyan portrays Hambardzum Hambardzumyan
Vahe Petrosyan portrays Qajik Aslanyan
Haovhannes Davtyan portrays Mkho Arevshatyan
Hamlet Adiyan portrays Rshtun Rshtoyan
Anahit Kirakosyan portrays Susik
Gevorg Manukyan portrays Melo Hovsepyan
Sargis Vardanyan portrays Artyom
Armen Miqaelyan portrays Gago
Vahagn Sargsyan portrays Hamo
Armen Soghoyan portrays Baghdasaryan
Sepuh Apikyan portrays Bshtikyan
Armen Zakharyan portrays Papik Djamshoyan
Anati Saqanyan portrays Photographer
Sona Melqonyan portrays Lilith
 Nerses Hovhannisyan portrays Ara Haroutyunyan
Gevorg Chulyan portrays Samvel Musaelyan
Vahagn Khachatryan portrays Varos Varosyan
Gor Harutyunyan portrays Varujan Danielyan
Artur Hovsepyan portrays Peto
Vache Tovmasyan portrays Tiko
Armush portrays Serjant Gazazyan
Vahan Tovmasyan portrays Makaryan
Gevorg Grigoryan portrays
Mher Baroyan
Rafayel Tsaturyan portrays
Mrdo

References

External links
 
 Qaghaqum on Hayojax
 

Armenian comedy television series
Armenian-language television shows
Shant TV original programming
2009 Armenian television series debuts
2000s Armenian television series